Robin Murray (14 September 1940 – 29 May 2017) was an industrial and environmental economist. As a social entrepreneur, he advocated and implemented new forms of production and organization, based on principles of ecological sustainability, social justice, and democracy.  He developed his thought through practical projects and experiments. A common thread throughout his work was how collaboration, rather than competition, could be a driving force behind economic development and provide the foundation for non-exploitative and egalitarian societies.

Robin Murray influenced how people eat, shop, and work, how we create and handle waste. He was an influential member of the democratic-socialist movement in Britain, playing a role in setting up organizations such as Twin and Twin Trading (an alternative trading and development organization from which emerged farmer-owned Fairtrade companies Cafédirect, Divine Chocolate and Liberation Nuts), the London Food Commission and The London Climate Change Agency. He also played a role as a policymaker, first as Chief Economic Advisor to the Greater London Council in the early 1980s and later in the 1990s in shaping London's waste strategy. While working on these practical initiatives he taught at the Institute of Development Studies at the University of Sussex, and later at the London School of Economics and Schumacher College. Over the years he published articles including those describing the concepts of post-Fordism, zero-waste and social innovation. He was awarded posthumously the Albert Medal of the Royal Society of Arts in October 2017, for "pioneering work in social innovation".

Early life and education
Robin Murray was born inside a farmhouse in Patterdale on 14 September 1940 in what was then the County of Westmorland (now Cumbria). His mother and two older brothers had been evacuated from their London home at the onset of the Second World War and the London Blitz. His father was Stephen Hubert Murray (1908-1994) a barrister with chambers in King's Bench Walk in the Inner Temple and from 1951 a farmer in Hallbankgate, Cumbria. Stephen was the youngest son of Gilbert Murray, and Lady Mary Murray of Oxford, a connubial conjunction of Irish Catholic stock (via Australia) and English Whig aristocracy.

Robin's mother, Margaret Murray née Gillett (1907-1979) came from a long line of English Quakers. Her father was Joseph Rowntree Gillett, a banker and social philanthropist who went to work full time in the Rhondda Valley to alleviate suffering in the coalfields during the 1920s and 1930s. Margaret's mother, Richenda Gillett, was one of the first English women doctors, graduating from the University of London in 1895. Margaret herself was one of Britain's first female-chartered architects, graduating from the University of London in 1930 and practicing until the early 1970s.

Both parents joined the  Communist Party of Great Britain at the outbreak of the Spanish Civil War in 1936, their reason being that the CPGB was the only political party that understood and was taking action against the rise of fascism in Europe. They both left the Party at the signing of the Molotov–Ribbentrop Pact in 1939. Thereafter they both became members of the Labour Party, Stephen particularly active in the League of Labour Lawyers and later the Haldane Society. In early 1939 he was sent to Lithuania to represent Jewish citizens subjected to Nazi oppression. Stephen was heavily involved in the events of 1948 leading to the split of the Haldane Society of Socialist Lawyers from the Labour Party, over the question of communist membership.

The third of four sons, Robin's older brothers were Gilbert (1931-1963) a physicist and alpinist who died in a rockfall on Fox Glacier, New Zealand; and Alexander (1934-) who is a medieval historian. Hubert (1946-) is an architect living and working in Boston, Massachusetts.

The Murray family moved from Hampstead to Hallbankgate in Cumberland in 1951, Stephen Murray giving up his legal career to farm. Greenside Farm, Hallbankgate, a hill-farm in and around Coalfell, was in a mining area, and a family property of Lady Mary Murray (1865–1956), Stephen's mother and daughter of George Howard, 9th Earl of Carlisle; she passed it on to Stephen and his sister Rosalind Toynbee, wife of Arnold J. Toynbee.

Robin was sent to a variety of primary schools in the immediate post-war years, and on the move to the farm in Cumbria to White House School in Brampton (now the William Howard School). In 1952 his parents sent him to Bedales School, a coeducational boarding school in Hampshire, founded in 1893 on the Arts and Crafts principles of educating the head, the hand and the heart. Gilbert and Alexander (Sandy) had both preceded him at the school during and immediately after the war. It was at Bedales that Robin met his future wife Frances (née Herdman, 1941-) and together they became head boy and girl of the school (1957-8).

Having completed his exams, in 1959 Murray spent several months in between leaving school and going up to university working for Danilo Dolci in Partinico, Sicily. The moral compass he inherited from his family (on both sides), his experience of working with parents and brothers on their Cumbrian hill farm and the year spent with peasants and villagers on community projects in the face of vested interests were all formative influences in his subsequent intellectual and professional trajectory, harnessed in the interests of social progress.

Murray studied Modern History at Balliol College, Oxford, (1959-1962), then at the College of Europe in Bruges where we received a Diploma in European Studies (1962-1963), finally at the London School of Economics where he earned his MSc in economics (1963-1966). While studying at the LSE, Murray was an Adult Education Lecturer for the Oxford University Extra Mural Department, the Inner London Education Authority and the Workers Education Association.

Career

1960s 
On finishing his studies, Murray became a lecturer in economics at the London Business School between 1966 and 1970.  He was part of the group that helped bring the May Day Manifesto into being, and then contributed with Michael Barrett Brown to the economics section of the 1968 Penguin edition which was edited by Raymond Williams. The original 1967 edition was edited by Stuart Hall, Edward Thompson and Raymond Williams. Thereafter he joined the Institute of Development Studies at the University of Sussex (IDS) as a Fellow in Economics where he stayed until 1993.

1970s 
During the 1970s Murray played a critical role in the Brighton Labour Process Group which provided a series of papers for the inaugural Conference of Socialist Economists (CSE) in the 1970s. He was also involved in the CSE's evolution, namely the Bulletin of the CSE and later the peer-reviewed academic journal Capital and Class in which he contributed two articles in its first two years, and several articles thereafter. The journal continues to be published. During this period, Murray was involved in setting up and leading the Marxist Capital Reading Group in Brighton and was active in the Brighton local community organization QueenSpark. For two decades at the IDS, Murray's academic work focused on industrial strategy, trade policy, Marxist theory, flexible specialization, and international corporate taxation. As a teacher, he was noted for his use of the Socratic method and metaphor.

1980s 
Between 1982 and 1986, Robin Murray worked as the Director of Industry and Employment at the Greater London Council and was tasked with developing the London Labour Plan and the London Industrial Strategy. The latter set out an action plan to regenerate London's economy in a socially sustainable way, creating a blueprint for the Labour Party's future national economic policies.

In the months leading up to the abolition of the GLC, Murray and his colleagues created the Third World Information Network (Twin) which initially imported goods from the Global South in solidarity with the co-operative movement. Following on from this, Robin Murray and colleagues went on to set up Twin Trading, an innovative and groundbreaking organization which combined trade with social and economic development in partnership with coffee co-operatives in Mexico, Peru, Nicaragua and East Africa. In so doing, Twin and Twin Trading were at the forefront of the Fair Trade movement, one of the great social innovations developed in response to the post-imperial contradictions of political self-determination shackled by economic dependency.

Reflecting on his experience at the GLC, Robin Murray wrote a number of highly influential articles in Marxism Today on the emergent subject of ‘post-Fordism’. These articles played a critical role in introducing the concept of ‘post-Fordism’ to the wider left in the UK. His view was that contemporary forms of production could further the classical democratic socialist objectives of co-operation, democratic self-management, and self-realization. Drawing on his experience at the GLC, Murray learned the inadequacy of traditional industrial policy to those sectors which were rooted in particular cultural and/or geographical communities (reproduction furniture, clothing, branches of food production, and a range of cultural industries). What they often lacked – economically – was the collective institutions developed most notably in the so-called Third Italy (such as consortia, specialist colleges, centers of ‘real’ services’) which allowed small firms to have access to those services normally only available to large firms; quality control and branding, information on design, markets, and technology, skilled labor and political representation in the capital.

Much of Murray's work in the 1980s and 1990s was about strengthening these types of economy, particularly linked to the economic development of particular places and communities. This was done partly through advice to governments (local, provincial, and national) and through the work of Twin Trading, the alternative trading intermediary set up to strengthen small farmers from marginal regions in Latin America and Africa in first world markets.

1990s 
During this time, Robin Murray became Programme Adviser to the SEEDS Association of Local Authorities (1986-1993). He subsequently became Visiting Professor at Carleton University in Ottawa and a Special Adviser to the Minister of Economic Development and Trade in the Government of Ontario (1993-1995). In Ontario, where he was responsible for Community Economic Development policy for the Provincial Government, his focus was on three sectors: food, culture and green industries. The cultural industries work was directed towards (a) providing support to ethnic communities and areas with high unemployment in establishing and expanding their own cultural industries (through new distribution facilities, training programmes, cultural industry finance, and cultural spaces – including in one case a crematorium) and (b) allowing existing cultural institutions to re-conceptualize themselves within a wider cultural economy – museums, libraries, art galleries, cinemas and theatres.

Upon his return to the UK in the mid-1990s, Murray became the Chair of Twin and Twin Trading, the Fair Trade organizations responsible for developing the fair trade brands Cafedirect, Divine Chocolate, Agrofair UK and Liberation Foods. He held this position until 2007. Between 2005 and 2009 Murray was the Chair of Liberation Foods (formerly The Ethical Nut Company).

2000s 
In the late 1990s and early 2000s, Murray's work focused on industrial restructuring in response to environmental pressures (notably waste and energy). It is during this period that Murray wrote Creating Wealth from Waste and Zero Waste. During this period, he was Director of the London Pride Waste Action Programme (1996-1997), executive director of the London Recycling Consortium (1997-2004) and Chair of the Tower Hamlets Community Recycling Consortium (2003-2007). Between 1998 and 2002 Murray also helped to devise local waste policies in Essex, Newcastle upon Tyne, Lancashire and Greater Manchester. Between 2003 and 2008, he played a key role as Environmental Adviser to London's Deputy Mayor, Nicky Gavron in developing London's recycling policy and setting up the London Climate Change Agency. Between 2001 and 2002 he was a member of the Planning Advisory Group to the Greater London Authority, advising on spatial planning in London. The following year Murray was a member of the Waste Advisory Group for the Cabinet Office of the UK Government, advising on waste policy. In 2003, he was a Special Adviser to the Parliamentary Select Committee on Waste. Between 2005 and 2007, Robin led the development of the Green Homes Concierge Service for London.

Between 2004 and 2005 Murray was the acting director of RED, the research and innovation arm of the Design Council. He oversaw projects in Kent and Bolton on co-creating health services. These and other projects developed and refined Murray's thoughts on the critical role of design in public service reform and social innovation. Murray was able to continue his work in this area as a visiting fellow at Nesta (2008-2010) and The Young Foundation (2008 – onwards) where he led a major research project examining the ways to design, develop and grow social innovation. As part of this project, Murray co-authored The Open Book of Social Innovation and Social Venturing and wrote Danger and Opportunity.

2010s 
After this, Murray undertook a strategic review of the future of co-operation in the UK for Co-operatives UK (2010-2011). He continued his work on the social economy as a Visiting Research Fellow at the Centre for the Study of Global Governance and then a Senior Visiting Fellow at the Civil Society and Human Security Research Unit at the LSE (2011-2017). He also taught at Schumacher College.

Interests
Murray's interests as economist included: Marxian theory; transfer pricing, globalisation and transnational corporations; industrial policy and cooperatives; fair trade, local economic development, international development, the environment, waste and recycling, social innovation and the social economy and the circular economy.

Marxism
In Internationalization of Capital and the Nation State (1971) Murray argued that the internationalization of capital weakened the political power of the nation state. His theses in this article were criticized at the time by Bill Warren, who found in particular Murray's discussion of "territorial non-coincidence" unconvincing. With Murray advocating the view that ultra-imperialism was displacing national capitalisms, and Warren instead claiming that imperialism was being replaced by those capitalisms, Robert Rowthorn took an intermediate view, predicting a future of nationalist rivalries.

In two papers from 1977 on Value and Theory of Rent, Murray worked with the assumption that Karl Marx's theory of differential and absolute ground rent applies generally to landed property, of whatever kind. His phrase "founder's rent" has been called "muddled".

Transfer pricing
In his editor's introduction to Multinationals Beyond the Market (1981), Murray wrote of the international trade theory of neoclassical economics as faced with challenges on two sides: from the theories around unequal exchange, and also, the focus of the book, from institutional critique. His paper in the volume stated that the arm's length principle for transfer pricing had become problematic for international trade, referring to customs literature for issues on how to carry out the accounting. He mentioned two other public policy approaches: anti-monopoly legislation, and bilateral bargaining to correct the asymmetry present in trading relationships, with state intervention. He had already argued in a 1970 conference paper for a descriptive framework of the bargaining process between international companies and nation states, given that these negotiations often were asymmetric. Murray's widely used teaching case study on bargaining over access to North Sea oil deposits showed how the choice of the discount rate affected the distribution of rents between the state and the private sector. Building on this case-study and drawing on the work of Constantine Vaitsos on the pharmaceutical industry, Murray convened an influential conference on transfer pricing at the Institute of Development Studies in Sussex in 1975. This made an important contribution to foregrounding the control of transfer pricing in development policy, particularly in the operational work of the United National Conference on Trade and Development (UNCTAD).

Fair trade
Co-founder in 1985 with Michael Barratt Brown of Twin Trading, a fair trade company, Murray played a part in the creation of the brands Cafédirect and Divine Chocolate. Barratt Brown, a personal friend, had retired from Northern College for Residential and Community Adult Education in 1983 and come to work with Murray at the GLC. There he contributed to the London Industrial Strategy. The British government Department for International Development commissioned a report Understanding and Expanding Fair Trade from Barratt Brown, Murray and Pauline Tiffen.

Twin Trading moved after the International Coffee Agreement broke down in 1989, to market a popular coffee. To that end it went into partnership with Equal Exchange, Oxfam and Traidcraft to set up the Cafédirect brand.

Fordism and Post-Fordism
Murray has been credited with the introduction to British debate of ‘Post-Fordism’ – and in particular its application to building a progressive, socially democratic state. Although the genesis of the concept is credited to the regulation school of French economists, Murray primarily drew upon the ideas of the American economists Michael J. Piore and Charles Sabel, who saw a ‘Second Industrial Divide as flexible specialization began to replace mass production, as well as upon the work of Michael Best on Japan and the industrial districts in Northern Italy. Writing on the subject in the 1980s, at a time when Keynesian macro-economic policies appeared to have run their course, Murray viewed both the Thatcherite imposition of rational choice models onto the British public sector and the Soviet system as outdated expressions of Fordism – characterised by centralised but fragmented organisation, standardised processes, hierarchical management, deskilled labour and passive end users. Furthermore, building upon his practical experience at the Greater London council (GLC), he observed that dynamic and innovative businesses had moved on: car factories in Japan, industrial districts of Italy and the new high tech enterprises of Silicon Valley were all adopting more nimble and flexible strategies, focusing on skills, innovation and participation.  

This analysis informed Murray’s work as a hands-on policy consultant, in the UK, in Canada and also in developing economies. For example, he led a multi-year programme of support for industrial policy in Cyprus in the late 1980s, promoting the development of clusters of small and medium-sized firms serving niche markets. He viewed both his own team-leadership and the role of government as being akin to conducting an orchestra, helping the ‘players’ to perform effectively and in harmony. However, it is his theoretical work on the development of a post-Fordist state for the information age that now seems most prescient, echoed in current political debates for a Green New Deal. Murray viewed those innovative industries abandoning classical Fordism as harbingers of future competitiveness in a post-Fordist economy and as potential carriers of new progressive social relations. He wrote of the need to restructure both industry and the state ‘from the bottom up’ and to direct new technologies in the service of social and environmental needs rather than only the pursuit of private profit. He saw the potential of information technology as a tool for the coordinated differentiation and devolution of public services, applying the ‘just-in-time’ data flows, production and distribution of clothing giants such as Benetton. ‘Front-line operative autonomy’ could be restored to the public sector, building an ‘integrative culture’ that included the replacement of utilitarian economics ‘with a concerned sociology’ in university education for public service. Essentially, the state was to move from regulator to coordinator, strategist, and supporter of initiatives, with the deep involvement of the end user.

The Social Economy 

The incorporation of a strong civil society with public and private initiatives was key to Murray's vision of an environmentally and socially-sustainable world derived from post-Fordist principles. The term that he preferred was the social economy; not a separate ‘third sector’, but a shared space existing at the intersection of state, household, market and ‘the grant economy’, whose defining feature is the provision of services driven by the imperative of social values rather than financial accumulation. Murray's social economy was populated not by passive consumers but active users, or ‘prosumers’. He developed this vision through existing case studies, drawing on his work with cooperatives and environmental advocacy groups, healthcare coalitions and social entrepreneurs. Equipped with the coordination capabilities offered by ICT, communities, municipalities and nation states could thus build links, reign in global corporate power and design a flexible polity rooted in what Murray profoundly believed to be the creative power of all human beings.

Bibliography

1960s 

Robin Murray (ed.), Vietnam: No 1. in the Read-in series, Eyre & Spottiswoode, London, 1965
Robin Murray, Vietnam, in Views, no. 9, 1965
 Robin Murray, "The Aluminium Industry in Guinea", (mimeo) 29 pp 1967
 Robin Murray, Economics and the London Business School, 1967
 Contributor to New Left, May Day Manifesto 1967
 Robin Murray, "International oligopoly in the Metal Container Industry", Case study. mimeo. 15 pp. 1969
 Robin Murray, North Sea Gas: a case study, together with teaching note (mimeo) 14 pp and 29 pp. 1969
 Robin Murray, "Eurodollars: a survey" 57 pp. (mimeo), 1969

1970s 
Robin Murray, "The Political Economy of Communications" joint paper with Tom Wengraf and Stephen Hymer, Spokesman no.5 1970 pp 8–14
Robin and Frances Murray, ‘An examination of the existing constabularies and inspectorates concerning themselves with the sea and the sea bed’ in Quiet Enjoyment: Arms control and police forces for the ocean, Proceedings of the Preparatory Conference on Arms Control and Disarmament, January 1970.
Robin Murray, Multinational Companies and Nation States: Two Essays, Spokesman Books, 1975. The two essays were originally published in The Spokesman Journal, Numbers 10 and 11 in 1971 as “The Internationalisation of Capital and the British Economy”, and  “The Internationalisation of Capital and the Nation State”. 
Robin Murray, Anatomy of Bankruptcy, Spokesman Books, 1971
Robin Murray, "Kanpur: a case study in the transfer of technology", (mimeo) 14 pp. 1972
Robin Murray, "Bankruptcy at Upper Clyde Shipbuilders", The Spokesman 20 Dec 1971-Jan 1972   pp 9 – 22.
Robin Murray, Underdevelopment, international firms, and the international division of labour, inTowards a New World Economy, Rotterdam University Press, 1972
Robin Murray, Technology Transfer: a case study of Ethiopia, UNCTAD 1974
Robin Murray, Major Issues arising from the transfer of technology. A case study of Ethiopia. Report by the UNCTAD secretariat. Geneva, United Nations, 1974
HVA and the Nationalisation of the sugar industry in Ethiopia, Robin Murray, IDS, May 1976
A Case Study of Creeds" Brighton CSE Labour Process Group 1976, CSE Annual Conference 1976 pp 1 – 34
The Production Process of capital and the capitalist labour process by the Brighton Labour Process Group, Robin Murray, Hugo Radice et al., 1976
The State and the Labour Process: notes, minutes and paper, 1976
Robin Murray, Rent and the Development of Landed Property, IDS, 1976
Robin Murray, A Code for Compensation of Nationalised Assets, Government of Ethiopia, 1976
Robin Murray, "Value and the Theory of Rent part 1" in Capital and Vol. 1, No. 3. Autumn. 1977 pp 101-121
Robin Murray, Transfer pricing and the State, Conference on Transfer Pricing, IDS, 6–10 March 1978
Robin Murray, "The Chandarias: a case study of a Kenyan Multi-national" in ed. R Kaplinsky, Multinational Firms in Kenya, OUP 1978
Robin Murray, "Value and the Theory of Rent part 2" in Capital and Class Vol. 2/ No. 1. Spring. 1978 pp 9-33
Robin Murray and Andrew Goodman, Video and Development studies: IDS and the use and production of audio visual materials for development studies, May 1978
Collectivism, statism and the associated mode of production: Notes towards the critique of the political economy of socialism as it actually exists. Brighton Labour Process Group, July 1979

1980s 
Olivier le Brun and Robin Murray, The Seychelles National Youth Service: The seed of a new society, 1980
 Olivier le Brun and Robin Murray, The Seychelles National Youth Service Part 2 - From Seed to the Flower, 1981
Robin Murray, From Colony to Contract: HVA and the Retreat from Land, IDS, 1981
Robin Murray, "Transfer pricing and the State: a Manual, UNCTC, 1981
Robin Murray (ed) Multinationals beyond the Market: intra-firm trade and the control of transfer pricing, Harvester Press, 1981
Robin Murray (ed) Multinationals beyond the Market, Harvester Press, 1981
Olivier le Brun and Robin Murray, One Year Later: Seychelles National Youth Service project, 1982
Robin Murray, Christine White and Gordon White (eds), Revolutionary Socialist Development in the Third World, Harvester Press, 1983
Robin Murray et al., Brighton on the Rocks: Monetarism and the Local State, Brighton, QueenSpark Books, 1983
Robin Murray, New Directions in Municipal Socialism in (ed.) B Pimlott, Fabian Essays in Socialist Thought, Heineman 1984
Bridges not Fences. Report of Third World Trade and Technology Conference, GLC/TWIN, 1985
Robin Murray, London and the Greater London Council: restructuring the Capital of Capital, In Slowdown or crisis? Restructuring in the 1980s, IDS Bulletin 1985, Vol.16, no 1, IDS
D Stevenson and R Murray, The Future of Planning: London's Proposals, 1985
Benetton Britain: The new economic order, Marxism Today, Nov 1985, 28-32
Robin Murray, "What are the lessons from London?" in: K. Coates (ed.) Joint Action for Jobs, Spokesman Press, 1985
Robin Murray, Flexible specialisation and development strategy’ in (eds.) Huib Ernste and Verena Meier, Regional Development and Contemporary Industrial Response, 1986
Robin Murray, Public sector possibilities, Marxism Today, July 1986, 28-32
Robin Murray, ‘Ownership, Control and the Market’, New Left Review, no.164, 1987
Robin Murray, Social ownership for the 1990s: a local view of a national vision, Local Work 3 January 1987
Robin Murray, Cyprus Industrial Strategy, Report of the UNDP/UNIDO Mission. Main Report, Institute of Development Studies, 1987]
Robin Murray, South-South Divide, SEEDS, 1987
Robin Murray, "Pension Funds and Local Authority Investment" in ed. L Harris, New perspectives on the Financial System, Croom Helm, 1987
Robin Murray, Breaking with bureaucracy: Ownership, Control and Nationalisation, Centre for Local Economic Strategies, 1987
Robin Murray, Cyprus Industrial Strategy. Report on the fourth stage. IDS, June 1988
Robin Murray, Crowding Out: Boom and Crisis in the South East, SEEDS, Delivered to SEEDS Association, National Union of Railwaymen, London, 28 November 1988
 Robin Murray, the Production of Industrial Strategy, IDS, 7–8 July 1988
 Life after Henry (Ford), Marxism Today, Oct 1988, 8-13
Robin Murray, "Right Lines: a study of British Rail Services in the South East", 1988
Robin Murray and Kurt Hoffman, Flexible specialisation: the potential for Jamaica. Report of an exploratory mission. IDS, 1989
 Robin Murray, Fordism and Post-Fordism in Stuart Hall and M Jacques (eds.) New Times: The Changing Face of Politics in the 1990s, Verso 1989.

1990s 
Robin Murray, Flexible Specialisation in small island economies: the case of Cyprus, Paper prepared for the International Conference on Industrial Districts and Local Economic Regeneration, ILO, Geneva, 18/19 October 1990
Robin Murray, Regional Economic Policy in Europe in the 1990s in the light of the experience of the 1980s, Report prepared on behalf of Agenor for the European Commission, May 1990
Robin Murray, ‘Multinationals and social control in the 1990s’, European Labour Forum, no. 2, Autumn 1990. Pg. 31-35
Avril Joffe, Robin Murray and Sandar Sips, Fordism and Socialist Development, IDS, 1990
Robin Murray, Small scale enterprise in the economic thought of the British Left. Paper for the Bologna meeting on small firms and socialist economic thought, October 15 and 16, 1990.
Robin Murray, The Last Resort: a study of tourism and post tourism in the South East of England, (editor and contributor), 1990
Robin Murray, Flexible Specialisation in Jamaica, Future Perspectives, IDS February 1991
Robin Murray, The State after Henry, Marxism Today, pp 22-27, May 1991  
Robin Murray, Local Space: Europe and the New Regionalism: economic practice and policies for the 1990s, 1991
Robin Murray, International developments in the food industry, Prepared as part of the Jamaican Food Industry Strategy for the United Nations Industrial Development Organisations on behalf of Jampro and the Government of Jamaica. IDS, 1992
Robin Murray, Flexible Specialisation and Agro-Industry in Honduras, Prepared for the United Nations Industrial Development Organisation and the United Nations Development Programme on behalf of the Government of Honduras. IDS, 1992
Robin Murray, La piccola impresa nel pensiero economico della sinistra Britannica, in Il Ponte, Rivista di politica economica e cultura fondata da Piero Calamandrei, Agosto-Settembre 1992, Vallecchi Editore, Firenze, 1992
Robin Murray, Europe and the New Regionalism", in M. Dunford and G. Kafkalas (eds.)  Cities and Regions in the New Europe: the global-local interplay and spatial development strategies. Belhaven Press, 1992
Robin Murray, Flexible specialisation and development strategy: the relevance for Eastern Europe in H. Ernste and V. Meier (eds.) Regional development and contemporary industrial response, Belhaven Press, 1992
Robin Murray, The theory and practise of local economic development, A Guide, Planact, Johannesburg, 1992
Robin Murray, From Bologna to Basildon: local economic development, Planact, Johannesburg, 1992
Robin Murray, Towards a Flexible State, IDS Bulletin vol. 23, no. 4, 1992
Robin Murray, New Forms of Public Administration, Introduction, IDS Bulletin, vol. 23, no.4, 1992
Geoff Mulgan and Robin Murray, Reconnecting Taxation, Demos, 1993 
Robin Murray, Small and medium firms in a Russian agricultural district: the case of Shakhovskoy, 1993
Robin Murray, Roderick Snell, Victor Steinberg and David Youlton, A strategy for the TV and Video Equipment Industry in the former Soviet Union". A Report prepared for the European Bank for Reconstruction and Development, IDS, April 1993.
Robin Murray, "Transforming the State" in G Albo, D Langille and L Panitch (eds.) A different kind of state. Toronto, Oxford University Press 1993
Robin Murray, Administration and industrial development in Eritrea. A report to the Ministry of Trade, Industry and Tourism, November 1993
Robin Murray, Community Economic Development: a review, Government of Ontario, 1995
Robin Murray, "Centres for Real Services: the case of textiles in Emilia Romagna" in ed. Rush, Technology Institutes: Strategies for Best Practice, Routledge 1996
Robin Murray and Adrian Atkinson, "Environment and Development" in Ines Newman and Mike Geddes (eds) Re-making the regional economy: celebrating achievement. Shaping new policies for the south east, SEEDS, 1997
Restructuring the State: the case of economic administration in Cyprus, May 1998
Robin Murray, Life after Henry (Ford), Marxism Today, October 1998
Robin Murray, Re-inventing Waste: Towards a London Waste Strategy, Ecologika, 1998 
Robin Murray, Creating Wealth from Waste, London, Demos, 1999
Robin Murray, Understanding and expanding fair trade, DFID, 1999

2000s 
 Robin Murray, Zero Waste, London: Greenpeace, 2002 
 Robin Murray, Julie Caulier-Grice and Geoff Mulgan, How to Innovate: the tools for social innovation, The Young Foundation, 2008
Robin Murray, "Zero Waste" in Slow Food Almanac, Slow Food Editore, Bra, 2008
 Robin Murray, Julie Caulier-Grice and Geoff Mulgan, Social Venturing, Nesta, London, 2009
Robin Murray, Danger and opportunity, Nesta, London, 2009
 Robin Murray, Julie Caulier-Grice and Geoff Mulgan, The Open Book of Social Innovation, Nesta, London, 2010.

2010s 
Robin Murray, "Raising the Bar or Directing the Flood" in John Bowes (ed.) The Fair Trade Revolution, Pluto, 2011
Robin Murray, Cooperation in the age of Google - A review for Co-operatives UK, 2011
Robin Murray, ‘Global civil society and the rise of the civil economy’ in Helmut Anheier, Marlies Glasius, and Mary Kaldor (eds.) Global Civil Society 2012, Palgrave Macmillan, 2012
Robin Murray, The new wave of mutuality: social innovation and public service reform’ Policy Network Paper, June 2012
Robin Murray, Jeremy Gilbert & Andrew Goffey (2014), Post-post-Fordism in the era of platforms. New Formations, 84/85: Societies of Control, Winter 2014 / Summer 2015, 184-208.
Robin Murray, ‘Prospects for innovation in the co-operative economy’ in Ed Mayo (ed.) Co-operative Advantage, Manchester, 2015
Contributor to Can Design Catalyse the Great Transition? Papers from the Transition Design Symposium 2016

Family
In 1965 Murray married Frances Herdman, whom he had known since Bedales School, and had two daughters, Marika and Bethany.  Marika (1968-) son Joseph (1999-). Bethany (1971-) daughter Isabella (2017-).

References

External links
The Robin Murray Living Library 
 Robin Murray: Selected Writings. Edited by Michael Rustin 
 https://www.francesmurray.co.uk/

1940 births
2017 deaths
British economists
British Marxists
Alumni of Balliol College, Oxford
People educated at Bedales School